The Hegel Archives (German: Hegel-Archiv) were founded in 1958 in North Rhine-Westphalia to encourage historical-critical efforts to study the collected works of Georg Wilhelm Friedrich Hegel.  

The North-Rhine/Westphalian Academy of Sciences and the Felix Meiner Publishing House, Hamburg, are publishers of the collected works of Hegel.  Since 1968 the Hegel Archives has served as a facility for the faculty of Philosophy, Education and Journalism of the Ruhr University Bochum.

Research
Apart from publishing activity, the Hegel Archives also promotes Hegel research.  For example, it coordinates the following efforts:
the yearbook of Hegel studies (Hegel Studien) that since 1961 has provided a forum for research papers and a new bibliography;
its own writings and conferences;
a special library building that covers the work of Hegel's students;
an entire research literature beside Hegel's own works; and
Hegel's own monographs.

This library is open to Hegel researchers and international guests as well.

Director
The Hegel Archives was founded in 1958 by Otto Pöggeler, who is a German representative of phenomenology and hermeneutics.

The Director of the Hegel Archives is actually Professor Walter Jaeschke, who is also the Editor of the publication of the Collected Works of Hegel.  He is also the author of Reason in Religion: the Foundation of Religion in Hegel's Philosophy (1986).

Professor Jaeschke also assisted Dr. Peter C. Hodgson and a team of scholars at the University of California at Berkeley, who, in 1990, published a new translation of Hegel's Lectures on the Philosophy of Religion (1818-1831).  This publication radically changed the direction of 20th-century Hegel studies, according to some researchers in the Hegel Society of America.

In the review Hegel Studien were published works by Otto Pöggeler, Ernst Bloch, Hans-Georg Gadamer, Martin Heidegger, Karl Löwith, Heinz Heimsoeth, Dieter Henrich, Annemarie Gethmann-Siefert, Walter Jaeschke, Robert Brandom, John Sallis, Robert Pippin.

Notes

External links
Official Web site

Libraries in Germany
Georg Wilhelm Friedrich Hegel
Philosophical societies in Germany
1958 establishments in Germany
Libraries established in 1958